Kiprotich is a Kalenjin name, common in parts of Kenya and Uganda inhabited by the Kalenjin people. It stems from the term  "Rot Tich" which means cattle moving in from pasture which is between 5 PM and 6 PM. The prefix Kip-, means that the bearer is a male and was born while cattle where moving in from pasture. It is closely related to Kiprono. Its feminine counterpart is Cherotich.

Notable people

Athletes
 Collins Cheboi Kiprotich (born 1987), Kenyan middle-distance runner
 Filex Kiprotich (born 1988), Kenyan long-distance runner
 John Kiprotich, winner of 2011 Vienna City Marathon
 Nixon Kiprotich, (born 1962) Kenyan 800 metres runner
 Peter Kiprotich (1979–2011), Kenyan distance runner
 Stephen Kiprotich (born 1989), Ugandan long-distance runner and 2012 Olympic marathon champion
 Wesley Kiprotich (born 1979), Kenyan middle distance runner who specialises in the steeplechase
 Wilson Kipsang Kiprotich (born 1982), Kenyan long-distance runner
 David Kiprotich Bett (born 1992), Kenyan long-distance runner, who specialises in the 5000 meters
 John Kiprotich Chemisto, Kenyan marathon runner (see 2005 Saint Silvester Road Race)
 Kenai Kiprotich Kenei (born 1978), Kenyan long-distance runner
 Mark Kiprotich Mutai (born 1978), Kenyan runner, who specializes in 400 metres
 Matthew Kiprotich Birir (born 1972), former athlete from Kenya, winner of 3000 m steeplechase
 Wilson Kiprotich Kebenei (born 1980), Kenyan long-distance runner
 Collins Kiprotich Maiyo (born 2003), Kenyan nurse

Kalenjin names